The Roman Unrest, or The Noble-Minded Octavia (German: Die römische Unruhe, oder Die edelmütige Octavia), commonly called Octavia, is a singspiel in three acts by Reinhard Keiser to a German libretto by . It premiered on 5 August 1705 at the Oper am Gänsemarkt, Hamburg.

The work was written in response to Handel's now-lost Nero, using the same period, material and plot but with Feind substantially improving the libretto. It unites the insidious machinations of the mad emperor Nero, including the assassination plots against his stepsister and wife Octavia, the Pisonian conspiracy and its suppression, with a multicoloured sub-plot of the philosophical instructions of the wise Seneca versus the amusing observations of a clown named Davus. The action is held together by the interweaving of all these plots.

It has an abundance of slippery allusions, grotesque elements like a ballet of the dead, which seems to have been taken from a Shakespearean comedy, but above all shows its librettist's opposition to happy endings beloved of his Hamburg audiences.

Octavia is notable among Keisers's work for its lavish orchestration; it is the first recorded use of horns in an opera, and one aria calls for five bassoons.

Roles

References 
Notes

Sources
 Octavia, score in a supplementary volume of the Handel Werkausgabe, editora Friedrich Chrysander and Max Seiffert, Leipzig 1902

Operas
German-language operas
1705 operas
Operas by Reinhard Keiser
Opera world premieres at the Hamburg State Opera
Cultural depictions of Nero
Cultural depictions of Claudia Octavia
Cultural depictions of Seneca the Younger